John Valdivia (born July 19, 1975), is an American politician that served as the 34th mayor of San Bernardino, California.  Valdivia was unsuccessful in his bid for re-election in the 2022 San Bernardino mayoral election. In 2021, Valdivia became the first elected official in 20 years to be censured by the San Bernardino City Council for alleged misuse of public funds.

Early life and education 
John Valdivia was born on July 19, 1975, in San Bernardino, California. He received his bachelor’s degree from Evangel University. His graduate studies include a Masters of Divinity from Fuller Theological Seminary and a Master of Business Administration from Azusa Pacific University.

San Bernardino Councilman 
From March 2012 to December 2018, Valdivia served as the Councilman for the Third Ward in San Bernardino.  The ward includes the Auto Center, the Inland Center Mall, Hospitality Lane business corridor, the restaurant row, and the entertainment corridor.

In November 2011, Valdivia was elected with nearly 70% of the total vote, he was sworn into office March 2012.

In February 2014, Valdivia announced his candidacy for California's 31st Congressional District with the Republican Party. Valdivia dropped out of the race one month later citing timing issues and a desire to work on city issues.

Transient Occupancy Tax during his tenure increased from $2.2 million in 2012 to almost $5 million in 2018 by the end of Valdivia's term as Councilman. The transient occupancy tax pays for San Bernardino's police officers and firefighters.

Voters in his third ward district elected him for another term in November 2015.

Mayor of San Bernardino

Election 
On July 6, 2017, Valdivia announced his intention to run in the 2018 election for Mayor of San Bernardino against the incumbent R. Carey Davis. In the June 5, 2018 primary election Valdivia finished first place with 36 percent (35.8%) of the vote; Davis was the runner up with 28 percent (27.8%). As no candidate received a majority of the primary votes to be elected outright Valdivia and Davis advanced to a November 6 runoff election. In the election held on November 6, 2018, Valdivia received 19,155 votes (52.5%) to Davis's 17,327 (47.5%). Valdivia was sworn in as mayor on December 19, 2018.

Priorities 
Valdivia's four main objectives as mayor were "pro-growth, pro-development, pro-safety, and pro-business".

Valdivia has been a supporter of community-focused policing, in March 2019 the Mayor and City Council voted to reorganize the police department into a five-district policing structure, paving the way toward reopening police substations in the future.

Boards 
John Valdivia is currently the President of the San Bernardino International Airport Authority (SBIAA); he was originally appointed on February 27, 2019, and was re-appointed on October 23, 2019. Valdivia's focus as the president of SBIAA is to increase economic development in the area surrounding the airport resulting in more jobs and revenue for San Bernardino. Valdivia's other goals are to bring a commercial passenger airline to the airport, and encourage more cargo and logistics operations.

Valdivia is a member of various other boards these include:

 Inland Valley Development Agency (IVDA)
 San Bernardino County Transportation Authority (SBCTA) - Board of Directors
 San Bernardino County Transportation Authority - Metro Valley Study Session
 San Bernardino County Transportation Authority - Transit Committee
 Omnitrans Board of Directors

Scandals 
In February 2020, former city employees filed complaints against the City of San Bernardino claiming that Mayor John Valdivia had subjected them to a hostile work environment and would direct sexual comments and innuendos toward them. Valdivia rejected the claims and said they were "politically driven."

In March 2020, a field representative for the city filed a complaint stating that Valdivia had instructed his chief of staff to falsify performance evaluation forms, giving negative reviews to the two former employees that filed sexual harassment claims against Valdivia in February. On March 12, 2020, Assemblymember Eloise Reyes called on Valdivia to take a leave of absence until the claims were proven to be true, and, if they were proven, to "resign immediately." As of June 2020, Valdivia has not taken a leave of absence.

In April 2020, a fourth complaint was filed by another former employee, also claiming Valdivia created hostile environments and accusing him of sexual harassment. Valdivia was accused of insisting that he and the employee develop a personal relationship outside of work or he would fire her if she refused. This was the third sexual harassment claim filed by a former city employee.

Also in April 2020, Valdivia requested $50,000 from the City of San Bernardino to go toward the legal fees incurred from the claims against him. At the April 15, 2020 Regular Meeting of the Mayor and City Council, the City Council voted 4–3 in favor of tabling the decision to fund legal representation to Valdivia. Council Members Theodore Sanchez (Ward 1), Fred Shorett (Ward 4), Henry Nickel (Ward 5), and Jim Mulvihill (Ward 7) voted in favor of tabling. Council Members Sandra Ibarra (Ward 2), Juan Figueroa (Ward 3), and Bessine Littlefield-Richard (Ward 6) voted against tabling.

Additionally, the City of San Bernardino has paid $50,000 since February to an independent investigator over the claims brought forward against Valdivia. In May, the investigator requested an additional $30,000 to continue the investigation.

On December 2, 2021, San Bernardino City Council voted to censure Valdivia after an investigation commissioned by the Council found that Valdivia misused public funds for a private promotional event. The investigation also concluded that between September 2019 and April 2021, Valdivia requested reimbursement from the city for travel and hotel costs that overlapped with large financial contributions to Valdivia's reelection campaign. City Council has suggested that it will consider additional penalties for Valdivia, including possible criminal charges and removal from regional boards.

Personal life 
Valdivia resides in San Bernardino with his wife, Bethany, and their two children.

Electoral history

City Council

Mayor

References

1975 births
Living people
Azusa Pacific University alumni
Evangel University alumni
Fuller Theological Seminary alumni
Mayors of San Bernardino, California